A Game of Thrones: Genesis is a 2011 strategy game developed by Amusement Cyanide and published by Focus Home Interactive for Microsoft Windows. The game is an adaptation of the series of fantasy novels A Song of Ice and Fire by George R. R. Martin and is the first video game adaptation of the novels. The game takes place over 1,000 years of the fictional history of Westeros, beginning with the arrival of the Rhoynar led by the warrior-queen Nymeria.

Gameplay
Gameplay focuses on capturing nodes—castles, towns and goldmines—with characters. Emphasis is placed on the rock-paper-scissors mechanics of "underhanded" characters rather than the brute force combat strength of traditional realtime strategy games.

The goal of the game is to win the Iron Throne and doing so can be done by amassing enough 'prestige' within the game.

Each house has special units and abilities. House Stark has direwolves and House Baratheon has better archers for example.

The game has two modes of play: Versus and Campaign. The game features four main facets: diplomacy, military, economic, and underhand.

Reception

A Game of Thrones: Genesis received "mixed" reviews according to the review aggregation website Metacritic.

References

External links
 
 Official website
 Publisher game page
 Developer game page

2011 video games
Fantasy video games
Strategy video games
Video games based on A Song of Ice and Fire
Video games developed in France
Windows games
Windows-only games
Cyanide (company) games
Focus Entertainment games